North Carolina's 76th House district is one of 120 districts in the North Carolina House of Representatives. It has been represented by Republican Harry Warren since 2019.

Geography
Since 2019, the district has included part of Rowan County. The district overlaps with the 33rd Senate district.

District officeholders

Election results

2022

2020

2018

2016

2014

2012

2010

2008

2006

2004

2002

2000

1998

1996

References

North Carolina House districts
Rowan County, North Carolina